The Miss Illinois is a pageant program affiliated with Miss America, which is competition for women models representing the state of Illinois.

The first "Miss Illinois" sent to the national pageant was Lois Delander who subsequently won the Miss America title. Including Delander, five Miss Illinois representatives have won the Miss America title.

Monica Nia Jones of Chicago was crowned Miss Illinois 2022 on June 11, 2022 at Marion Cultural Arts & Civic Center in Marion. She represented Illinois and competed for the title of Miss America 2023 at the Mohegan Sun in Uncasville, Connecticut in December 2022 where she was in the Top 11 and the People's Choice winner.

Results summary
The following is a visual summary of the past results of Miss Illinois titleholders at the national Miss America pageants/competitions. The year in parentheses indicates the year of the national competition during which a placement and/or award was garnered, not the year attached to the contestant's state title.

Awards received by contestants competing as Miss Chicago at the national pageant are denoted with a "*".

Placements
 Miss Americas: Lois Delander (1927), Judith Ford (1969), Marjorie Vincent (1991), Katherine Shindle (1998), Erika Harold (2003)
 1st runners-up: Bette Brunk* (1942), Sandra Truitt (1982), Jade Smalls (2000)
 2nd runners-up: Trudi Germi (1949), Florence Gallagher* (1956), Jean Ahern (1975)
 3rd runners-up: Arlene Causey (1936), Elaine Steinbach* (1944), Jeri Zimmermann (1990)
 4th runners-up: Margaret Leigh (1924), Jo Hoppe* (1953), Tracy Hayes (1996)
 Top 10: Patricia Hayes (1942), Marjorie Nelson* (1943), Adrianne Falcon* (1952), Regina Dombeck* (1955), Sandra Jean Stuart* (1957), Suzanne Ingeborg Johnson (1960), Colleen Metternich (1974), Hannah Smith (2011), Megan Jo Ervin (2012), Isabelle Hanson (2022)
 Top 11: Monica Nia Jones (2023)
 Top 12: Betty June King (1944)
 Top 13: Lee Mercer Wieland* (1945)
 Top 15: Ethel Lorraine Lodbell (1939), Lois Nettleton* (1948), Teresa Giorgian* (1949), Abby Foster (2018)
 Top 16: Patricia Frye (1946), Cloris Leachman* (1946), Marjorie Adams* (1951)

Illinois holds a record of 36 placements at Miss America.

Awards

Preliminary awards
 Preliminary Lifestyle and Fitness: Bette Brunk* (1942), Trudi Germi (1949), Jo Hoppe* (1953), Sandra Stuart* (1957), Pamela Gilbert (1963), Judith Ford (1969), Jeri Zimmermann (1990), Tracy Hayes (1996), Megan Jo Ervin (2013)
 Preliminary Talent: Suzanne Ingeborg Johnson (1960), Judith Ford (1969), Colleen Metternich (1974), Jean Ahern (1975), Sandra Truitt (1982), Marjorie Vincent (1991), Katherine Shindle (1998), Jenny Powers (2001), Isabelle Hanson (2021)
 Preliminary Interview: Erika Harold (2003)
 Preliminary On-Stage Interview: Erika Harold (2003)

Non-finalist awards
 Non-finalist Talent: Audra Deckmann* (1959), Margaret McDowell* (1961), Vicky Joyce Nutter (1961), Donnalyn Freund* (1963), Dulcie Scripture (1970), Debra Carlson (1979), Blythe Sawyer (1981), Cindi Hodgkins (1988), Cheryl Majercik (1992), Kathleen Farrell (1993), Sara Martin (1994), Chuti Tiu (1995), Amanda Jo Meadows (1999), Jenny Powers (2001)

Other awards
 Miss Congeniality: Patsy Bruce (1955)
 America's Choice: Abby Foster (2018), Monica Nia Jones (2023)
 Charles & Theresa Brown Scholarship: Marisa Buchheit (2015)
 Equity & Justice Scholarship Award Finalists: Ariel Beverly (2020)
 Overall Interview Award: Erika Harold (2003)
 Quality of Life Award Winners: Cheryl Majercik (1992)
 STEM Scholarship Award Winners: Jaryn Franklin (2017)

Winners

Notes

References

External links
 Official website

Illinois culture
Illinois
Women in Illinois
Recurring events established in 1927
1927 establishments in Illinois
Annual events in Illinois